"Blue on Blue" is a popular song composed by Burt Bacharach with lyrics by Hal David, first recorded  and released by Bobby Vinton in April 1963, backed by Burt Bacharach and his Orchestra.  Vinton's single spent 13 weeks on the Billboard Hot 100 chart, peaking at No. 3 on July 6, 1963, while reaching No. 2 on Billboard's Middle-Road Singles chart. Vinton's single was a major hit in many other nations as well.

The song was ranked No. 42 on Billboards end of year ranking "Top Records of 1963".

The success of "Blue on Blue" prompted Bobby Vinton to record an entire album of blue-themed songs, also titled Blue on Blue, which produced an even bigger hit in the No. 1 "Blue Velvet".

Chart performance

Cover versions and samples
The song has been covered or sampled by many artists, including: 
"Blue on Blue" has been recorded by Paul Anka (1963) 
Percy Faith (1964), Maureen McGovern (1991), and many others. 
In 2017, Marc Almond released the song on his album of mainly cover songs called "Shadows & Reflections". Almond had previously sung the song at a Burt Bacharach evening at the London Palladium, which Bacharach performed in himself.
Samples of a cover version of the song by Gals and Pals from 1966 were included in Röyksopp's song "So Easy".
"Blue on Blue" was also covered by Say Lou Lou in 2015 and used in commercials for the Swedish clothing company Gina Tricot.

References

1963 singles
Bobby Vinton songs
Songs with lyrics by Hal David
Songs with music by Burt Bacharach
1963 songs
Epic Records singles
Number-one singles in Israel